Mercurio Antonio López Pacheco y Portugal Acuña Manrique Silva Girón y Portocarrero, twice Grandee of Spain, 9th Duke of Escalona, 9th Marquis of Villena, 15th Count of Castañeda,  11th Count of San Esteban de Gormaz and 9th Count of Xiquena (Escalona, 9 May 1679 – Madrid, 7 June, 1738), was a Spanish aristocrat and academician.

He was the son of the 1st Director of the Royal Spanish Academy (founded 1713) Juan Manuel Fernández Pacheco 8th Duke of Escalona, and himself was its 2nd lifetime Director from 1725 to 1738. He was promoted to be a Knight of the Order of the Golden Fleece in 1724 and was Mayordomo mayor to the King and chief of his Royal Household from 1725 to 1738.

Some references
http://www.fuenterrebollo.com/Heraldica-Piedra/marqueses-villena-segovia.html

|-

|-

|-

1679 births
1738 deaths
Counts of Spain
Counts of San Esteban de Gormaz
109
Marquesses of Villena
Knights of the Golden Fleece of Spain
Members of the Royal Spanish Academy
Grandees of Spain

Spanish nobility